The following are the national records in speed skating in France maintained by the Fédération Française des Sports de Glace (FFSG).

Men

Women

References

External links
 FFSG website

National records in speed skating
Speed skating-related lists
Speed skating in France
Speed skating
Speed skating